Bangladesh–Italy relations relate to the foreign relationship between Bangladesh and Italy. Bangladesh maintains its embassy in Rome while Italy has an embassy in Dhaka.

History 
Italy established official relations with Bangladesh in 1972. In 1974, Italy was one of the countries that sponsored the admission of Bangladesh to the United Nations. In 2014, Bangladesh Prime Minister Sheikh Hasina paid an official visit to Italy.

Educational and technological cooperation 
In 2000, an agreement on "Scientific and Technological Cooperation" was signed between Bangladesh and Italy. As per the agreement, the two countries has been exchanging scientists, researchers and technicians as well as providing study grants. Italy has been accommodating an average of 25 Bangladeshi researchers annually to study at the Abdus Salam International Centre for Theoretical Physics.

Economic relations 
Bangladesh and Italy have formed 'Italy-Bangladesh Chamber of Commerce and Industry (IBCCI)' to boost the bilateral economic relations. Between 2000 and 2006, the bilateral trade between the two countries increased by more than 200%. As of 2012, the total amount of the bilateral trade stood at $1.286 billion, of which Bangladesh's export to Italy accounts for $1.036 billion. Bangladesh's main export items to Italy include frozen food, agri-products, tea, leather, raw jute, jute goods, knitwear, woven garments etc. Italy's chief export items to Bangladesh include machineries, electronic products, vehicles, aircraft, vessels and associated transport equipments.

Bangladeshi diaspora in Italy 

As of 2016, there were 142,000 Bangladeshis living in Italy.

See also 
 Foreign relations of Bangladesh
 Foreign relations of Italy
 Bangladesh–European Union relations

References 

 
Italy
Bilateral relations of Italy